Per Skjærvik (born 16 May 1953) is a Norwegian politician for the Labour Party.

He served as a deputy representative in the Parliament of Norway from Sør-Trøndelag during the term 2005–2009.

On the local level Skjærvik is mayor of Rissa municipality since 1995.

References

1953 births
Living people
Labour Party (Norway) politicians
Deputy members of the Storting
Mayors of places in Sør-Trøndelag
Place of birth missing (living people)
21st-century Norwegian politicians